Askerøya is an island in Tvedestrand municipality in Agder county, Norway. The  island lies along the Skagerrak coast. The island is just southwest of the Lyngør area and just northeast of the islands of Borøya and Sandøya. There is no road connection to the island other than via a ferry.

See also
List of islands of Norway

References

Islands of Agder
Tvedestrand